Schizopathidae is a family of corals belonging to the order Antipatharia.

Genera

Genera:
 Abyssopathes Opresko, 2002
 Alternatipathes Molodtsova & Opresko, 2017
 Bathypathes Brook, 1889

References

Antipatharia
Cnidarian families